VDV may refer to:

 Soviet Airborne Forces (Vozdushno-desantnye voyska), a branch of service in the Soviet Armed Forces
 Russian Airborne Forces (Vozdushno-desantnye voyska), a branch of service in the Russian Armed Forces
 Ukrainian Airmobile Forces (Vysokomobil'ni desantni viyska), formerly a branch of the Ukrainian Ground Forces until becoming an independent branch. From 1992 until 21 November 2017, the name VDV was used before being changed to DShV as part of the policy of Ukrainization.
 Verband Deutscher Verkehrsunternehmen, a German public transport association, and also its standard developed for communication in public transport
 Vereinigung der Vertragsfussballspieler, a professional footballer's union in Germany
 Rafael van der Vaart (born 1983), Dutch footballer